The third US ship to be named Enterprise was a schooner, built by Henry Spencer at Baltimore, Maryland, in 1799. Her first commander thought that she was too lightly built and that her quarters, in particular, should be bulletproofed. Enterprise was overhauled and rebuilt several times, effectively changing from a twelve-gun schooner to a fourteen-gun topsail schooner and eventually to a brig. Enterprise saw action in the Caribbean, the Mediterranean, and the Caribbean again, capturing numerous prizes. She wrecked in July 1823.

First Caribbean tour 
Lieutenant John Shaw commissioned Enterprise. On 17 December 1799, during the Quasi-War with France, Enterprise departed the Delaware Capes for the Caribbean to protect United States merchantmen from the depredations of French privateers. Within the following year, Enterprise captured eight privateers and liberated 11 American vessels from captivity, achievements that assured her inclusion in the 14 ships retained in the Navy after the Quasi-War. Placing her for sale was suggested in mid-March 1801.

First arrival in Mediterranean 
After Lieutenant Shaw, due to ill health, was relieved by Lieutenant Andrew Sterett, Enterprise sailed to the Mediterranean. The need for new masts delayed her departure from Baltimore until early May 1801. She reached Gibraltar on 26 June 1801, where she was to join other U.S. warships in the First Barbary War.

Battle with corsair Tripoli 

Enterprise's first action came on 1 August 1801 when, just west of Malta, she defeated the 14-gun Tripolitan corsair Tripoli, after a fierce but one-sided battle. Enterprise emerged unscathed and sent the battered pirate into port.

The action was described in Washington City's National Intelligencer & Adv. on 18 November 1801.
Naval Victory

Yesterday captain Sterret, commander of the schooner Enterprize, part of the Mediterranean squadron, arrived here, with dispatches for the Secretary of the Navy.

Captain Sterret is bearer of dispatches from commodore Dale, which exhibit a detailed account of the proceedings and situation of the Mediterranean squadron.

On the 1st of August, the schooner Enterprize, commanded by captain Sterret, and carrying 12 six pounders and 90 men, bound to Malta for a supply of water, fell in with a Tripolitan cruizer, being a ship of 14 six pounders, manned by 80 men.

At this time the Enterprize bore British colours. Captain Sterret interrogated the commander of the Tripolitan on the object of his cruize. He replied that he came out to cruise after the Americans, and that he lamented that he had not come alongside of some of them.  Captain Sterret, on this reply, hoisted American, in the room of British colours; and discharged a volley of musquetry; which the Tripolitan returned by a partial broadside.—This was the commencement of a hard fought action, which commenced at 9 am and continued for three hours.

Three times, during the action, the Tripolitan attempted to board the Enterprize, and was as often repulsed with great slaughter, which was greatly increased by the effective aid afforded by the Marines.  Three times, also, the Tripolitan struck her colours, and as often treacherously renewed the action, with the hope of disabling the crew of captain Sterret, which, as is usual, when the enemy struck her colours, came on deck, and exposed themselves, while they gave three cheers as a mark of victory.

When for the third time, this treacherous attack was made, captain Sterret gave orders to sink the Tripolitan, on which a scene of furious combat ensuded, until the enemy cried for mercy.

Captain Sterret, listening to the voice of humanity, even after such perfidious conduct, ordered the captain either to come himself, or to send some of his officers on board the Enterprize.  He was informed that the boat of the Tripolitan was so shattered as to be unfit for use.  He asked, what security there was, that if he should send his men in his own boat, they would not be murdered?

After numerous supplications & protestations the boat was sent: The crew of the Tripolitan was discovered to be in the most deplorable state.  Out of eighty men, 20 were killed, and 30 wounded.  Among the killed were the second lieutenant and Surgeon; and among the wounded were the Captain and first lieutenant.  And so decisive was the fire of the Enterprize that the Tripolitan was found to be in a most perilous condition, having received 18 shot between wind and water.

When we compare this great slaughter, with the fact that not a single individual of the crew of the Enterprise was in the least degree injured, we are lost in surprise at the uncommon good fortune which accompanied our seamen, and at the superior management of Captain Sterrett.

All the officers and sailors manifested the truest spirit, and sustained the greatest efforts during the engagement.  All, therefore, are entitled to encomium for their valour and good conduct.  The marines, especially, owing to the nearness of the vessels, which were within pistol shot of each other, were eminently useful.

After administering to the relief of the distresses of the wounded Tripolitans, and the wants of the crew, Capt. Sterrett ordered the ship of the enemy to be completely dismantled.  Her masts were accordingly all cut down, and her guns thrown overboard.  A spar was raised, on which was fixed, as a flag, a tattered sail; and in this condition the ship was dismissed.

On the arrival of the Tripolitan ship at Tripoli, so strong was the sensations of shame and indignation excited there, that the Bey ordered the wounded captain to be mounted on a Jack Ass, and paraded thro' the streets as an object of public scorn.  After which he received 500 bastinadoes.

So thunderstruck were the Tripolitans at this event, and at the apprehended destruction of their whole marine force, that the sailors, then employed at Tripoli on board of cruisers that were fitting out by the government, all deserted them, and not a man could be procured to navigate them.

On 3 February 1802, the U.S. Congress resolved that Sterett receive a commemorative sword; the rest of Enterprises crew received a month's pay.

Remainder of Mediterranean patrol 
At Gibraltar on 3 October 1801, Enterprise was ordered to return to Baltimore with dispatches for the Secretary of the Navy. While in port, Sterett received orders on 17 November to pay off and discharge the crew. He was advised that he would receive a furlough and replaced after he oversaw the ship's refitting. Master Commandant Cyrus Talbot was offered the command, but he was discharged 23 October 1801, under the Peace Establishment Act.

Enterprises next victories came in 1803 after months of carrying despatches, convoying merchantmen, and patrolling the Mediterranean. On 17 January, she captured Paulina, a Tunisian ship under charter to the Bashaw (Pasha) of Tripoli, and on 22 May, she ran a 30-ton craft ashore on the coast of Tripoli. For the next month Enterprise and other ships of the squadron cruised inshore, bombarding the coast and sending landing parties to destroy enemy small craft.

On 12 November 1803 Stephen Decatur assumed command of Enterprise. On 23 December 1803, after a quiet interval of cruising, Enterprise joined with frigate Constitution to capture the Tripolitan ketch Mastico. The captured vessel was taken back to Syracuse and refitted and renamed . Command was then turned over to Enterprise's commander Lieutenant Decatur. Because of her regional appearance the ketch was well suited for making its way into Tripoli's harbor without raising suspicion and was used in a daring expedition to board, capture and burn the frigate Philadelphia, captured by the Tripolitans and anchored in the harbor of Tripoli. Decatur and volunteers from Enterprise carried out their mission almost perfectly, destroying the frigate and depriving Tripoli of a powerful warship.

Enterprise continued to patrol the Barbary Coast until July 1804 when she joined the other ships of the squadron in general attacks on the city of Tripoli over a period of several weeks.

Enterprise passed the winter in Venice, Italy, where she was practically rebuilt by May 1805. She rejoined her squadron in July and resumed patrol and convoy duty until August 1807. During that period she fought (15 August 1806) a brief engagement off Gibraltar with a group of Spanish gunboats that attacked her but which she was able to drive off. Enterprise returned to the United States in late 1807, and cruised coastal waters until June 1809. After a brief tour in the Mediterranean, she sailed to New York where she was laid up for nearly a year.

1811 recommissioning 
Repaired at the Washington Navy Yard, Enterprise was recommissioned there in April 1811, then sailed for operations out of Savannah, Georgia and Charleston, South Carolina. She returned to Washington on 2 October and was hauled out of the water for extensive repairs and modifications: when she sailed on 20 May 1812, she had been rerigged as a brig.

At sea when war was declared on Britain, she cruised along the east coast during the first year of hostilities. On 5 September 1813, Enterprise sighted and chased the brig . The brigs opened fire on each other, and in a closely fought, fierce, and gallant action which took the lives of both commanding officers, Enterprise captured Boxer and took her into nearby Portland, Maine, with Edward McCall in command. Here a common funeral was held for Lieutenant William Burrows, Enterprise, and Captain Samuel Blyth, Boxer, both well known and highly regarded in their respective naval services.  Both Burrows and Blyth were buried in the Eastern Cemetery in Portland near the grave of Commodore Edward Preble.

Second Caribbean patrol 
After repairing at Portland, Enterprise sailed in company with brig , for the Caribbean. The two ships took three prizes before being forced to separate by a heavily armed ship on 25 February 1814. Enterprise was compelled to jettison most of her guns in order to outsail her superior antagonist. The brig reached Wilmington, North Carolina, on 9 March 1814, then passed the remainder of the war as a guardship off Charleston, South Carolina.

Mediterranean, New Orleans, and West Indies Squadrons 

Enterprise served one more short tour in the Mediterranean Squadron (July–November 1815), then cruised the northeastern seaboard until November 1817. In 1818 she was under the command of Lieutenant Lawrence Kearny of the New Orleans Squadron, who evicted Jean Lafitte from Galveston, Texas. From that time on she sailed the Caribbean Sea and the Gulf of Mexico as one of the founding vessels of what later became the West Indies Squadron in 1821. She was active in suppressing pirates, smugglers, and slavers; in this duty she took 13 prizes. An attack on Cape Antonio, Cuba in October 1821 resulted in the rescue of three vessels taken by pirates, and the breaking up of an outlaw flotilla reputedly commanded by James D. Jeffers, aka Charles Gibbs.

Fate
Enterprises career ended on 9 July 1823, when she stranded and broke up on Little Curacao Island in the West Indies. Her crew suffered no casualties.

Legacy
For her illustrious career, the ship earned the nickname "Lucky Enterprise". The yacht that defended the 1930 America's Cup was named after her, and sailed with a model of her in the captain's cabin.

See also

List of historical schooners
List of ships of the United States Navy named Enterprise
Bibliography of early American naval history
The fictional Star Ship USS Enterprise, featured in the Star Trek television and films series, is named after the real life line of naval vessels named Enterprise.

Bibliography
 Url
  Url

References

Further reading 

Schooners of the United States Navy
Quasi-War ships of the United States
Barbary Wars American ships
War of 1812 ships of the United States
Shipwrecks in the Caribbean Sea
Maritime incidents in July 1823
Ships built in Baltimore
1799 ships